The 2021  season was the team's 11th season overall, of which all of them have been at UCI WorldTeam level, and the 6th season under the current name.

Team roster 

Riders who joined the team for the 2021 season

Riders who left the team during or after the 2020 season

Season victories

National, Continental, and World Champions

Notes

References

External links 
 

Trek-Segafredo men
2021
Trek-Segafredo men